The Hellenic Radio (or ERA) is the main public radio broadcaster in Greece. Founded in 1987 as a subsidiary of public broadcaster Hellenic Broadcasting Corporation (ERT), it broadcasts four domestic radio channels and the international shortwave radio channel Voice of Greece.

History
After the collapse of the Greek junta, the conservative Karamanlis government brought the main public television channel EIRT under civilian government control. It was renamed to Hellenic Broadcasting Corporation (ERT). Both the second domestic television channel (later renamed ERT2) and public radio broadcasting however remained under the auspices of the Armed Forces Information Service (YENED).

Only in 1982, the socialist Papandreou government dissolved YENED and placed all public broadcasting under civilian government control. In 1987, the four domestic channels ERA 1, ERA 2, ERA 3 and ERA 4 as well as the multilingual shortwave service Voice of Greece (ERA 5) were consolidated under the new legal structure Hellenic Radio, a subsidiary of the now overarching Hellenic Broadcasting Corporation (ERT).

The same 1987 law provided for the establishment of municipal and private-sector stations. This wasn't before the first municipal station Athens 98.4 FM already went on air on 31 May 1987 without a proper license, but backed by then-mayor of Athens Miltiadis Evert. Subsequently a number of stations opened and state radio gradually declined in both audience and importance, with large media corporations gaining ground. By 2002, Hellenic Radio however still maintained 19 regional stations throughout the country.

Radio stations

ERΤ regional radio

ERΤ Aegean (Mytilene)
ERΤ Volos
ERΤ Zakynthos
ERΤ Heraklion
ERΤ Ioannina
ERΤ Kavala
ERΤ Kalamata
ERΤ Corfu
ERΤ Kozani
ERΤ Komotini
ERΤ Larissa
ERΤ Orestiada
ERΤ Patras
ERΤ Pyrgos
ERΤ Rhodes
ERΤ Serres
ERΤ Tripoli
ERΤ Florina
ERΤ Chania

On weekdays from 7:00 to 10:00, the regional radio stations of the ERΤ network used to send a local news program, covering the individual station's broadcasting area. This was followed by a news program covering the larger region. During the afternoon hours, the stations broadcast an entertainment program, partly adopted from First, Second Programme and ERA Sport.

Some regional radio stations produced their own local program at a second local news bulletin between 18:00 and 20:00, and a mostly entertaining weekend program.

Domestic and special interest stations

First Programme (ERA 1)
Second Programme (ERA 2)
Third Programme (ERA 3) 
ERA Sport
Kosmos 93.6
Voice of Greece
102 FM

References

Further reading

External links
 

Hellenic Radio
Public radio in Greece
1987 establishments in Greece